is a Japanese seinen manga series written and illustrated by Kei Ogawa and published by Kodansha. It's serialized in Weekly Young Magazine. It was adapted into a Japanese television drama in 2014.

Characters
 Minowa (Matsu)
 Natsumi Takada (Sayaka Yamaguchi)

References

External links
Official TV series website 

2013 manga
Comedy anime and manga
Kodansha manga
Nippon TV original programming
Seinen manga
Yomiuri Telecasting Corporation original programming